Syed Abdul Jabbar Shah was an aristocrat of Swat, He led a government at Kabal Tehsil from 1914 by temporarily deposing Miangul Abdul Wadood.He was a descendant of Syed Ali Shah Tirmizi

References

Pashtun dynasties